Nicolas Guigon (born 10 October 1980 in Échirolles) is a French pole vaulter. Representing his nation France in the men's pole vault at the 2004 Summer Olympics, Guigon cleared a height at 5.75 metres to set his own personal best from the national athletics meet in Reims. Throughout his sporting career, Guigon trained for the track and field club ASPTT Grenoble, under his personal coach, 1991 Mediterranean Games champion, and two-time Olympian Philippe d'Encausse (1988 and 1992).

Guigon qualified for the French squad in the men's pole vault at the 2004 Summer Olympics in Athens. Two months before the Games, he registered a personal best clearance and an Olympic A-standard of 5.75 m to secure a spot on the French team at the national athletics meet in Reims. During the prelims, Guigon started off with a single foul, until he successfully surpassed 5.30 m on the second attempt. Failing to clear his next targeted height of 5.50 m after three straight misses, Guigon shared a thirty-first spot with Poland's Adam Kolasa throughout the overall standings, and did not advance past the qualifying round.

References

External links

1980 births
Living people
French male pole vaulters
Olympic athletes of France
Athletes (track and field) at the 2004 Summer Olympics
People from Échirolles
Sportspeople from Isère
20th-century French people
21st-century French people